Madmen and Specialists is a play by Wole Soyinka, conceived in 1970 during his imprisonment in the Nigerian Civil War. The play, Soyinka's eighth, has close links to the Theatre of the Absurd. Abiola Irele (in the Lagos Sunday Times) called it "a nightmarish image of our collective life as it appears to a detached and reflective consciousness". It was published in London 1971 by Methuen and in New York in 1972 by Hill & Wang.

Madmen and Specialists is considered Soyinka's most pessimistic play, dealing with "man's inhumanity and pervasive corruption in structures of power". The plot concerns Dr. Bero, a corrupt specialist, who imprisons and torments his physician father.

References

1970 plays
Plays by Wole Soyinka
Nigerian plays